Jansenia is a genus of tiger beetle in the family Cicindelidae. There are nearly 40 species in the genus, all of which are found only in South Asian region, with several endemic to India and Sri Lanka. The genus is characterized on the basis of the male genitalia. Species in the genus include:

References

Cicindelidae
Adephaga genera
Taxa named by Maximilien Chaudoir